The following highways are numbered 990:

United States